"Beef and butt beer, against mum and pumpernickle" was an 8-page drinking song published in 1743 in London.

A protest song published with the specific intent of stirring up trouble for the King, at the time George II of Great Britain who, like his father George I of Great Britain was originally from Germany, the song was anti-German.

In one of the verses of the song "Calvert’s Butt" is compared as a crystal clear alternative to "Muddy Mum". The drinkers of the day would have recognized Calvert as one of the main producers of porter beer, while Muddy Mum was a German style of wheat beer flavored with herbs and, as the term 'muddy' implies, thought of as less pure than the English porter.

Notes

Drinking songs
English songs
Songs about alcohol
1743 songs
Anti-German sentiment
Songwriter unknown